Malygino is a rural locality (a settlement) in Malyginskoye Rural Settlement, Kovrovsky District, Vladimir Oblast, Russia. The population was 2,084 as of 2010. Malygino has 7 streets.

Geography 
Malygino is located 13 km northwest of Kovrov (the district's administrative centre) by road. Kislyakovo is the nearest rural locality.

References 

Rural localities in Kovrovsky District